Love & Basketball is a 2000 American romantic sports drama film written and directed by Gina Prince-Bythewood in her feature film directorial debut. The film is produced by Spike Lee and Sam Kit and stars Sanaa Lathan and Omar Epps. It tells the story of Quincy McCall (Epps) and Monica Wright (Lathan), two next-door neighbors in Los Angeles, who are pursuing their respective basketball careers before eventually falling for each other.

Love & Basketball was released on April 21, 2000 in the United States. It received positive reviews from critics, with praise directed at the performances of Lathan and Epps, Prince-Bythewood's direction and script, and the emotional weight of the film. Nevertheless, it grossed $27.7 million worldwide on a production budget of $14–20 million.

Over the years, the film has developed a dedicated following, cementing its place in popular culture, and establishing itself as a cult classic.

Plot 
Since childhood, Monica Wright and Quincy McCall have wanted to be professional basketball stars. However, as a girl, Monica has to work hard to establish herself, while as a boy, Quincy's natural star potential is recognized and encouraged early on. As the two struggle to reach their goals of playing professionally, they must also deal with their emotions for each other.

The first quarter of the story takes place in 1981, when Monica's family moved to Los Angeles from Atlanta, moving into the house next door to Quincy's. Quincy's father Zeke is the star shooting guard for the Los Angeles Clippers. Quincy and Monica are drawn to each other instantly, sharing a love of basketball. Quincy is shocked that a girl could ever love basketball as much as he did, and he is even more shocked when Monica beats him during their first ever game of one on one. He angrily knocks her down during game point, and accidentally cuts her face. Their mothers intervene and soon Quincy and Monica have made up. Monica proves tougher than Quincy ever could've imagined in another person, and he draws closer to her, asking her to be his girlfriend. Monica accepts and they share their first kiss, but it isn't long before they insult each other and are rolling around on the grass fighting, with Monica clearly winning.

The second quarter of the story begins in 1988, when Monica and Quincy are the respective leaders of the Crenshaw High School men's and women's basketball teams. Scouts have taken clear notice of Quincy, who many see as one of the top prospects in the country. He is extremely popular with the other students, could have any girl in school that he wanted to, and dates one of the prettiest girls in school, but is still good friends and neighbors with Monica. Monica, on the other hand, struggles with her fiery emotions on the court, often resulting in technical fouls at critical moments of games, damaging potential scouting opportunities such as UCLA. She also secretly still harbors feelings for Quincy, but struggles to express them as he is always surrounded by other girls. Monica also struggles with her mother, Camille, who pressures her to give up basketball and "act like a lady." Through soul searching, Monica learns to control her emotions and leads her team to the state championship game. When she and her team come up short, Monica is devastated.

Monica begins to recover from the championship loss with the help of her older sister, Lena, who gives her a makeover. Lena even finds Monica a college friend to take her to her spring dance. Despite taking Shawnna Easton, Quincy notices Monica and compliments her appearance. Later that night, they both speak outside her window and reveal to each other how their dates didn't turn out as they'd hoped. Monica asks Quincy to open her letter from USC; which reveals she has been accepted. Quincy has accepted an offer from USC as well, and they celebrate with a kiss. This leads to them finally acting on their feelings, making love that night.

The third quarter begins during their freshman year at USC, Monica and Quincy are managing themselves as athletes, students, and a couple. While Quincy finds instant success on the court, Monica struggles for playing time behind senior guard Sidra O'Neal. Monica frequently has run-ins with her head coach Ellie Davis while her relationship in Quincy becomes more and more strained. Quincy struggles to deal with the media attention, while clashing against his father's efforts to convince Quincy to finish college before going pro. Monica finally earns the starting point guard spot at the end of the season. When Quincy discovers his father's infidelity he asks Monica to break her curfew to stay with him and she refuses. The next day Quincy blatantly cheats on Monica and makes sure she sees him, and the couple breaks up.

The fourth quarter follows the plot to 1993, a few years before the establishment of the WNBA. Monica is playing professional basketball with an International Women's Basketball Association (IBWA) team in Barcelona. Monica misses home, but can't imagine a life that doesn't include basketball. While Monica leads her team to a dominant victory in the championship game, she starts to realize that her love for basketball isn't the same as it was before.

Having left USC after his freshman season, Quincy is now engaged and in his fifth year in the pros, trying to find a role with his new team, the Los Angeles Lakers. He's had a difficult season, but finally finds some playing time when his coach subs him to replace Nick Van Exel. Immediately, Quincy bricks a three point shot, but makes up for it on the very next play with a showtime steal-dunk. But just as quickly as it seems he has turned his bad streak around, he suffers a devastating knee injury when he lands awkwardly after the play, tearing his ACL. His family rushes to the hospital to be with him, but his now divorced parents still have friction when they see each other. Monica hears about Quincy's injury, and flies home to see him. While visiting Quincy in the hospital, she learns that he is engaged to be married when his fiancée visits his room.

Monica has returned home and also falls into the usual squabbles with her mother Camille over old resentments. Camille tells Monica that she had to give up her own dreams after having children and she resents Monica for not appreciating the sacrifices she made for her family. Monica counter-argues that Camille never made her feel loved and accepted, because she kept trying to force her to give up her goals for a stereotypical "woman's role" in life that she didn't want.

Quincy completes physical therapy, while his wedding draws closer. Monica has quit basketball to work at a bank. Seeing how unhappy Monica is, Camille encourages her to fight for her career and the man she loves. Quincy and Monica meet and reminisce before Monica challenges him to a game of one-on-one, with high stakes; if he loses, he calls off the wedding and chooses Monica. Quincy agrees and wins, but can no longer be apart from Monica and chooses her instead. By 1998, Monica is playing in the new WNBA (as part of the Los Angeles Sparks) with her husband Quincy and their toddler daughter cheering.
 
In a post-credits scene, Quincy and Monica's daughter is shown playing basketball at a playground.

Cast 

 Sanaa Lathan as Monica Wright-McCall
 Kyla Pratt as young Monica 
 Omar Epps as Quincy McCall
 Glenndon Chatman as young Quincy 
 Alfre Woodard as Camille Wright, Monica's mother
 Dennis Haysbert as Zeke McCall, Quincy's father
 Debbi Morgan as Nona McCall, Quincy's mother
 Harry J. Lennix as Nathan Wright, Monica's father
 Boris Kodjoe as Jason
 Gabrielle Union as Shawnee
 Monica Calhoun as Kerry
 Regina Hall as Lena Wright, Monica's sister
 Naykia Harris as young Lena 
 Erika Ringor as Sidra O'Neal
 Christine Dunford as Coach Davis
 Tyra Banks as Kyra, Quincy's fiancée
 Al Foster as Coach Hiserman

Production
In writing the semi-autobiographical film, Prince-Bythewood said her goal was "to do a black When Harry Met Sally." She has credited executive producer Spike Lee with enabling the production of the film and the opportunity to direct her own script. Gabrielle Union, who wound up playing Quincy's high school love interest, originally auditioned for the lead role of Monica. Prior to playing Monica, Sanaa Lathan had never played basketball. Unbeknownst to Prince-Bythewood, stars Lathan and Omar Epps had started dating prior to the film's production.

This was the second film to feature both Epps and Dennis Haysbert; prior to this, they played teammates on a fictitious version of the Cleveland Indians in the 1994 baseball movie Major League II.

Soundtrack 

Love & Basketball is the soundtrack to the film, released April 18, 2000, on Overbrook Entertainment and Interscope Records. Production for the album came from several recording artists, including Raphael Saadiq, Angie Stone, Zapp, and Steve "Silk" Hurley. In the US, the album peaked at number 45 on the Billboard 200 and number 15 on R&B/Hip-Hop Albums. Stacia Proefrock of Allmusic gave the album a three-of-five star review, saying, "Songs like Meshell Ndegeocello's 'Fool of Me' help punctuate this story of childhood friends who love each other almost as much as they love the game of basketball. Other highlights of the soundtrack include songs from MC Lyte, Al Green, and Rufus."

Reception

Critical response 
On review aggregator website Rotten Tomatoes, the film holds an approval rating of 85% based on 113 reviews, with an average rating of 6.9/10. The site's critics consensus reads: "Confident directing and acting deliver an insightful look at young athletes." At Metacritic, the film has a weighted average score of 70 out of 100, based on 28 critics, indicating "generally favorable reviews". Audiences polled by CinemaScore gave the film an average grade of "A" on an A+ to F scale.

Film critic Lisa Schwarzbaum of Entertainment Weekly gave Love & Basketball an A− review. She enjoyed how the film portrayed women's sports in general and said, "The speed and wiliness of the game itself ensure that movies about men who shoot hoops are exciting, but the novelty of watching women bring their own physical grace to the contest is a turn-on."

Rachel Deahl of AllRovi gave the film 3.5 out of 5 stars. In her review she complimented Epps and Lathan on their performances, and said, "Love & Basketball serves as a somber reminder of how few films exist (much less love stories, much less ones that focus on the female perspective) about multi-dimensional African-American characters outside the ghetto." Film critic Desson Thomson of The Washington Post wrote, "Love and Basketball had moments of such tenderness and sophistication, complimented by such romantic dreaminess between lead performers Omar Epps and Sanaa Lathan. First-time filmmaker Gina Prince-Bythewood's film joins such films as The Best Man and The Wood, which look for the class, not the crass, in African American life."

New York Post critic Jonathan Foreman gave the film a mixed review; he appreciated how the film "effectively conveys the excitement of basketball from a player's point of view", but opined the film is "filled with fake-sounding dialogue you only find in the cheesiest TV movies." Roger Ebert, film critic for the Chicago Sun-Times, wrote, "The film is not as taut as it could have been, but I prefer its emotional perception to the pumped-up sports clichés I was sort of expecting. It's about the pressures of being a star athlete; the whole life, not the game highlights. I'm not sure I quite believe the final shot, though. I think the girl suits up for the sequel." Ebert gave the film three out of four stars. Robert Wilonsky of the Dallas Observer gave the film a negative review, saying "[it] is a film built upon transitions so weak and obvious it's astonishing the entire thing doesn't collapse on itself. You want to root for it, as you would any rookie underdog, but it offers nothing to cheer for." Of the acting, he stated, "Omar Epps possesses a chiseled body and a blank stare [...] Lathan is only slightly better, but she's stuck in a hollow role."

Box office 
Love & Basketball was released in North America on April 21, 2000 to 1,237 theaters. It grossed $3,176,000 its first day and ending its North American weekend with $8,139,180, which was the second-highest grossing movie of the April 21–23, 2000 weekend, only behind U-571. Love & Basketball grossed $27,459,615 in the United States, which is ninth all-time for a basketball film and thirty-seventh all-time for a sports drama. The film grossed $27,728,118 worldwide; $268,503 (1%) was grossed outside of the United States.

Home video 
Love & Basketball was released on DVD in the United States on after its theatrical release.
It was released by The Criterion Collection on Blu-ray on September 21, 2021.

Awards 
BET Awards

Black Reel Awards

Humanitas Prize

Independent Spirit Awards

Key Art Awards

NAACP Image Awards

References

Sources

External links

 
 
 
 
 Videos and photos at the Academy of Motion Picture Arts and Sciences
 Love & Basketball: For Your Heart an essay by Roxane Gay at the Criterion Collection

2000 films
2000 romantic drama films
40 Acres and a Mule Filmworks films
American basketball films
American coming-of-age films
American independent films
2000 independent films
Films about women's sports
Films set in Los Angeles
Films set in Barcelona
Films shot in Los Angeles
Films shot in Barcelona
Films about race and ethnicity
Films directed by Gina Prince-Bythewood
Films scored by Terence Blanchard
Films set in 1981
Films set in 1988
Films set in 1989
Films set in 1993
Films set in 1998
New Line Cinema films
African-American romantic drama films
2000 directorial debut films
Films set in the 1980s
Films set in the 1990s
2000s English-language films
2000s American films
African-American films